Colonel Annette Nkalubo, is a senior Ugandan military officer. She is the second highest-ranking military officer in the Uganda People's Defence Forces (UPDF).

Education
Nkalubo holds a Bachelor of Laws from Makerere University, She also holds a Diploma in Legal Practice obtained from the Law Development Centre, also in Kampala.

Career
Nkalubo, while at the rank of lieutenant, served as a Member of Parliament, representing the UPDF in the 6th parliament (1996 to 2001). She was promoted from the rank of major to lieutenant colonel in October 2008. In 2010, at the rank of lieutenant colonel, she served, on secondment, at the United Nations. In March 2011, Annette Nkalubo, at the rank of lieutenant colonel, served as the director of women's affairs in the UPDF. In January 2013, she was promoted from lieutenant colonel to colonel, making her the second highest-ranking woman military officer, behind Major General Proscovia Nalweyiso.

Other considerations
In March 2011, she was named among "Uganda's Top 50 Women Movers", of the time.

See also
 Proscovia Nalweyiso
 Flavia Byekwaso
 Edith Nakalema
 Rebecca Mpagi
 Christine Nyangoma
 Naomi Karungi

References

External links
Daredevil women on the frontline in Somalia
 Uganda: UPDF Explains Few Women Recruits
Kulayigye, Ankunda dropped as Nalweyiso becomes Major General

People from Central Region, Uganda
Living people
Ganda people
Year of birth missing (living people)
Ugandan military personnel